John T. Daniels House is a historic home located at Manteo, Dare County, North Carolina.  It was built about 1900, and is a two-story frame I-house dwelling with a two-story rear ell and Queen Anne design elements.  Also on the property is the former kitchen.

It was listed on the National Register of Historic Places in 2003.

References

Houses on the National Register of Historic Places in North Carolina
Queen Anne architecture in North Carolina
Houses completed in 1900
Houses in Dare County, North Carolina
National Register of Historic Places in Dare County, North Carolina
Roanoke Island